The 1999 Bank of the West Classic was a women's tennis tournament played on outdoor hard courts in Stanford, California in the United States. It was part of Tier II of the 1999 WTA Tour. It was the 28th edition of the tournament and was held from July 26 through August 1, 1999. The singles title was won by Lindsay Davenport.

Entrants

Seeds

Other entrants
The following players received wildcards into the singles main draw:
  Iva Majoli

The following players received wildcards into the doubles main draw:
  Mirjana Lučić /  Larisa Neiland

The following players received entry from the singles qualifying draw:

  Anne-Gaëlle Sidot
  Tamarine Tanasugarn
  Maureen Drake
  Fabiola Zuluaga

The following players received entry from the doubles qualifying draw:

  Maureen Drake /  Louise Pleming

Finals

Singles

 Lindsay Davenport defeated  Venus Williams, 7–6(7–1), 6–2

Doubles

 Lindsay Davenport /  Corina Morariu defeated  Anna Kournikova /  Elena Likhovtseva, 6–4, 6–4

References

Bank of the West Classic
Silicon Valley Classic
Bank of the West Classic
Bank of the West Classic
Bank of the West Classic
Bank of the West Classic